Temple is an unincorporated community in Sterling Township, Crawford County, Indiana, United States.

History
Temple was laid out by James L. Temple, and named for him.

A post office was established at Temple in 1884, and remained in operation until it was discontinued in 1940.

Geography

References

Unincorporated communities in Crawford County, Indiana
Unincorporated communities in Indiana